Fabian Jeker (born 28 November 1968 in Füllinsdorf, Switzerland) is a Swiss former road bicycle racer.

Palmarès 

1992
1st, Overall and Stage 3, Volta a Galicia
1995
1st, Stage 7, Critérium du Dauphiné Libéré
1996
1st, Escalada a Montjuïc
1998
1st, Escalada a Montjuïc
2000
1st, Escalada a Montjuïc
2001
1st, Overall, Stages 8 and 14, Volta a Portugal
1st, Overall, Volta a la Comunitat Valenciana
1st, Stage 4, Grande Premio do Minho
2002
1st, Overall, Stages 1 and 5, Grande Premio do Minho
1st, Stage 3, Volta ao Alentejo
2003
1st, Overall and Stage 4, Vuelta a Asturias
1st, Overall and Stages 3 and 4b, Troféu Joaquim Agostinho
1st, Stage 7, Paris–Nice
2004
Tour de Romandie
1st, Stage 4
2nd, Overall
2nd, Overall, Tour de Suisse

External links
Official Website 

Swiss male cyclists
1968 births
Living people
Sportspeople from Basel-Landschaft
Volta a Portugal winners